Gebhard Fürst (born 2 December 1948 in Bietigheim, Baden-Württemberg) is a German Roman Catholic bishop. He is the Bishop of Rottenburg-Stuttgart.

Fürst began his career attending the Collegium Ambrosianum in Stuttgart, where he studied Greek and Hebrew, in 1969.  He then studied theology at the Faculty of Catholic Theology at the University of Tübingen (1970) and at the University of Vienna (1971 to 1973). In 1975, he passed the necessary theological exams. He then entered the Seminary of Rottenburg-Stuttgart in Rottenburg am Neckar. He was ordained as a deacon in Nürtingen in 1976 and, a year later, he was ordained as a priest by Bishop  Georg Moser in the Basilica of St. Vitus in Ellwangen an der Jagst. That same year, he became the vicar at St. Joseph's Church in Stuttgart.

In 1986, Fürst became the Director of the Academy of the Diocese of Rottenburg-Stuttgart and a member of the Caucus of Bishop Ordinaries. The next year, he received his doctorate in fundamental theology for his work Sprache als metaphorischer Prozess. Johann Gottfried Herders hermeneutische Theorie der Sprache (Speech as a metaphorical process.  Johann Gottfried Herder's Hermeneutic Theory of Language). In 1993, he was  Chairman of the leadership circle of the Catholic Academy of Germany.  Fürst was made an honorary chaplain to the Pope (Monsignor) in 1999 and, a year later, the eleventh Bishop of Rottenburg-Stuttgart.

Today, Fürst is the Chairman of the Prize Committee of the "Aleksandr Men Prize for Cultural Ecumenism". He is also a member of the Culture Board of the State Capital of Stuttgart, a leading member in the Board of Trustees of the Academy of the Diocese of Rottenburg-Stuttgart, and a member of the Board of Directors of the Society of Friends and Patrons of the Academy. Fürst has further memberships in the History Club of the Diocese of Rottenburg-Stuttgart, in the Diocesan Institute, in the Theological Commission of the Consortium of the Christian Church in Baden-Württemberg (ACK), and in the Women's Commission of the Diocese of Rottenburg-Stuttgart (since 1999).  Bishop Fürst belonged to the national Ethics Council as the representative of the Catholic Church from 2001 to May 2004. The council was established by a 2001 decision of the German Cabinet.

Fürst is a member of A.V. Alania Stuttgart chapter of the Cartellverband der katholischen deutschen Studentenverbindungen.

In 2009, Fürst criticized the lifting of the excommunication of Bishop Richard Williamson and said that it had led to "external and internal alienation from the church on the part of many believers, to a betrayal of trust especially among Jewish sisters and brothers in their relationship to the Church, and to a considerable disturbance in the Christian-Jewish dialogue."

Views by Fürst 
In 2017, Fürst supported female ordination for deacon.

Works
 Sprache als metaphorischer Prozess: Johann Gottfried Herders hermeneutische Theorie der Sprache, Mainz: Matthias-Grünewald-Verl, 1988.
 "'Kirche braucht Kulturstationen'. Ein Gespräch mit Akademiedirektor Gebhard Fürst," in: Herder Korrespondenz 53 (1999)182-187.
 Zäsur: Generationswechsel in der katholischen Theologie/Akademie der Diözese Rottenburg-Stuttgart. Hrsg. von Gebhard Fürst. - Stuttgart: Akad. der Diözese Rottenburg-Stuttgart, 1997.
 Höllenerfahrungen in Literatur und Kunst (1998)
 Dialog als Selbstvollzug der Kirche? Ed. Gebhard Fürst. - Freiburg im Breisgau: Herder, 1997.
 Dialog als Selbstvollzug der Kirche? (Quaestiones disputatae 166) Hrsg.: Gebhard Fürst. Verlag Herder Freiburg i. Br./Basel/Wien 1997
 Das heilige Buch der Menschen. Johann Gottfried Herders hermeneutische Sprachtheorie der Bibel. Ein Beitrag zur Herder-Forschung, in: Fides quaerens intellectum: Beiträge zur Fundamentaltheologie. [Max Seckler zum 65. Geburtstag]/Ed. Michael Kessler. Tübingen 1992
 Wechselbekenntnisse: auf dem Weg zur Normalität; aus einer Ost-West-Begegnung in turbulenter Zeit, Ed. Gebhard Fürst, Stuttgart: Akad. der Diözese Rottenburg-Stuttgart, 1992.
 Dialog und Gastfreundschaft: 40 Jahre Akademie der Diözese Rottenburg-Stuttgart 1951 – 1991, [Ed. der Akademie der Diözese Rottenburg-Stuttgart. Verantw. für den Inhalt: Gebhard Fürst]. - Stuttgart: Akad. der Diözese Rottenburg-Stuttgart

References
This article is based on the German Wikipedia entry.

External links

  Diocese of Rottenburg-Stuttgart
  Biography
  Bischof Fürst zum Dialog Naturwissenschaft - Glaube
  Academy of the Diocese of Rottenburg-Stuttgart

1948 births
Living people
People from Bietigheim-Bissingen
Roman Catholic bishops of Rottenburg
21st-century German Roman Catholic bishops
Members of the European Academy of Sciences and Arts
Recipients of the Order of Merit of Baden-Württemberg
21st-century Roman Catholic bishops in Germany